Palmer's Drainage Windmill is located to the north of Upton Dyke close to the village of  Upton in the English county of Norfolk. Upton Dyke runs westerly from the River Bure in the civil parish of Upton with Fishley
. The Drainage mill can be found to the east of the village of Upton.

Description 
Palmer's Drainage Windmill is of an interesting design being one of only two ‘Hollow Post’ drainage mills left on the broads, the other being Clayrack Drainage Mill. The mill has a miniature cap and sails  based on its more traditional big brother tower drainage mills which can be seen on other parts of the Norfolk Broads. It is winded by a pair of tail vanes.

History 
Also like Clayrack drainage windmill, Palmer's drainage windmill is not on its original position. It was moved in 1976 from its previous site near Acle.

References 

Windmills in Norfolk
Windmills of the Norfolk Broads
Post mills in the United Kingdom
Windpumps in the United Kingdom
Broadland
Windmills completed in 1976